The 2021 WWE Hall of Fame was  a professional wrestling event produced by WWE that featured the induction of the 21st and 22nd classes to the WWE Hall of Fame. Due to the COVID-19 pandemic, the 2020 Hall of Fame ceremony did not occur—as a result, the originally announced Class of 2020 was inducted alongside the Class of 2021 at the 2021 induction ceremony. The event was taped on March 30 and April 1, 2021, at the WWE ThunderDome, hosted at Tropicana Field in St. Petersburg, Florida, and aired on April 6 on Peacock in the United States and the WWE Network internationally. Jerry Lawler served as the host for the Class of 2020 portion of the show while Corey Graves and Kayla Braxton were the hosts for the Class of 2021 portion.

Background
The 2020 WWE Hall of Fame ceremony was originally scheduled to take place on April 2, 2020, from the Amalie Arena in Tampa, Florida, as part of WrestleMania 36 week, and would have aired live on the WWE Network. However, the event was postponed due to the COVID-19 pandemic. On August 27, 2020, it was announced that the 2020 Class would be inducted alongside the Class of 2021 during WrestleMania 37 week; WrestleMania 37 itself was relocated to Tampa from its original location of Los Angeles, California. It was later confirmed that the 2021 ceremony would take place at the WWE ThunderDome at Tropicana Field in St. Petersburg, Florida. The event was pre-taped on March 30 and April 1 to air on April 6 on Peacock's WWE Network channel in the United States and on the standard WWE Network internationally. Fan reactions for the ThunderDome's virtual fans were also filmed ahead of time. There were no inductors for the Hall of Fame recipients. Instead, Jerry Lawler, Corey Graves, and Kayla Braxton hosted the show—with Lawler hosting the 2020 portion of the show and Graves and Braxton hosting the 2021 portion—and short video packages were played before the inductees made a short speech, which was limited to five minutes.

The first inductees for the 2020 Class of the WWE Hall of Fame were announced on December 9, 2019. The first of these was the New World Order (nWo). The members recognized for this induction were "Hollywood" Hulk Hogan, Kevin Nash, Scott Hall, and Sean Waltman. This induction made each of these members two-time inductees, with Hogan, Hall, and Nash previously being inducted for their individual careers and Waltman being previously inducted as part of D-Generation X in 2019, which also made Waltman the first back-to-back inductee. The next inductees were announced during Alexa Bliss' segment of "A Moment of Bliss" on the February 21, 2020, episode of SmackDown, where she announced that The Bella Twins (Brie Bella and Nikki Bella) would be inducted into the 2020 Class. This was followed up on the March 3 episode of WWE Backstage, where it was announced that John "Bradshaw" Layfield would be inducted. On the March 12 episode of the WWE After the Bell podcast, host Corey Graves revealed that The British Bulldog would be inducted posthumously, while on March 16, WWE and Yahoo! Japan announced that Japanese wrestler Jushin "Thunder" Liger would be inducted. On March 30, 2021, William Shatner was announced as an inductee into the Celebrity Wing of the Hall of Fame; Shatner was announced as part of the Class of 2020 instead of 2021 as he was originally intended to be inducted in 2020. On March 31, Fightful Select reported that Titus O'Neil received the 2020 Warrior Award during the 2021 induction ceremony as he was also originally intended to be inducted in 2020.

On March 10, 2021, Molly Holly was announced as the first inductee into the Class of 2021. Her announcement as the first inductee was made on WWE The Bump by her former tag team partner, The Hurricane. Eric Bischoff was announced as the next inductee into the 2021 Class during the WWE After the Bell podcast on March 18. According to Sean Waltman, the original idea was to induct Bischoff as a surprise member of nWo in 2020. On March 24, Kane and The Great Khali were announced as the next inductees into the 2021 Class, with Kane's announcement made by The Undertaker on WWE The Bump and Khali's made by Ranjin Singh on WWE Now India. On March 23, Fightfuls Sean Ross Sapp reported that Rob Van Dam (RVD) would be inducted as part of the 2021 Class. Sabu, who worked with RVD in both Extreme Championship Wrestling and WWE, also affirmed this report. RVD's induction was officially confirmed by WWE via Fox Sports on March 29. On April 4, Dave Meltzer of the Wrestling Observer Newsletter reported that Ozzy Osbourne was inducted as the 2021 celebrity inductee. On April 6, it was confirmed that long-time WWE employee Rich Hering would receive the 2021 Warrior Award.

On December 9, 2019, Batista had been announced as an inductee into the 2020 Class of the Hall of Fame. Prior to the 2021 event, however, his induction was retracted. Fightful Select reported that WWE wanted Batista to be inducted "when a full crowd can enjoy it." Batista himself posted to Twitter, confirming his removal, citing previous obligations as a reason for why he could not attend the 2021 event. He also said that WWE honored his request to induct him at a future ceremony.

Inductees

2020

Individual

Group
 Class headliners appear in boldface

Celebrity

Warrior Award

Legacy

2021

Individual
 Class headliners appear in boldface

Celebrity

Warrior Award

Legacy

References

2020 in professional wrestling
2021 in professional wrestling
WWE Hall of Fame ceremonies
2020 in the United States
2021 in the United States
Professional wrestling in St. Petersburg, Florida
Sports events postponed due to the COVID-19 pandemic
Events in St. Petersburg, Florida